Great Harbour Cay Airport  is an airport serving Great Harbour Cay, one of the Berry Islands in The Bahamas.

Facilities

Airlines and destinations

References

External links
 
 

Airports in the Bahamas
Berry Islands